Cypress-Redcliff was a provincial electoral district in Alberta, Canada, mandated to return a single member to the Legislative Assembly of Alberta using the first past the post method of voting from 1986 to 1993.

History
The Cypress-Redcliff electoral district derives its name from Cypress County, Alberta and the Town of Redcliff, Alberta.

Cypress-Redcliff was created following the re-distribution of Cypress electoral district in 1986. The electoral district would only last two elections, and would be re-distributed prior to the 1993 Alberta general election to the Cypress-Medicine Hat electoral district.

Members of the Legislative Assembly (MLAs)

Electoral history

1986 general election

1989 general election

See also
List of Alberta provincial electoral districts
Cypress County, Alberta, a rural municipality in southeastern Alberta, Canada
Redcliff, Alberta, a town in southeastern Alberta, Canada

References

Further reading

External links
Elections Alberta
The Legislative Assembly of Alberta

Former provincial electoral districts of Alberta